In process improvement efforts, quality costs or cost of quality is a means to quantify the total cost of quality-related efforts and deficiencies.  It was first described by Armand V. Feigenbaum in a 1956 Harvard Business Review article.

Prior to its introduction, the general perception was that higher quality requires higher costs, either by buying better materials or machines or by hiring more labor.  Furthermore, while cost accounting had evolved to categorize financial transactions into revenues, expenses, and changes in shareholder equity, it had not attempted to categorize costs relevant to quality, which is especially important given that most people involved in manufacturing never set hands on the product.  By classifying quality-related entries from a company's general ledger, management and quality practitioners can evaluate investments in quality based on cost improvement and profit enhancement.

Definitions
Feigenbaum defined the following quality cost areas:

The central theme of quality improvement is that larger investments in prevention drive even larger savings in quality-related failures and appraisal efforts.  Feigenbaum's categorization allows the organization to verify this for itself.  When confronted with mounting numbers of defects, organizations typically react by throwing more and more people into inspection roles.  But inspection is never completely effective, so appraisal costs stay high as long as the failure costs stay high.  The only way out of the predicament is to establish the "right" amount of prevention.

Once categorized, quality costs can serve as a means to measure, analyze, budget, and predict.

Variants of the concept of quality costs include cost of poor quality and categorization based on account type, described by Joseph M. Juran.

ISO 9004 also accounts for "external assurance" quality costs to account for customer– or government–required certifications (e.g., for UL, RoHS, or even ISO 9000 itself).

Reporting
To ensure impartiality, reporting should be performed by the accounting department.  Additionally, to make it more understandable to a wider audience, the total cost of quality should be reported as a percent of sales, cost of sales, cost of manufacturing, or for firms in the service industry, cost of operations.

See also
Activity-based costing
Gold in the mine
Project triangle

References

Costs
Quality control